The Wildlife Express Train is a  narrow gauge African themed heritage railroad at Disney's Animal Kingdom in Walt Disney World. During the ride, portions of the Animal Kingdom backlot can be seen, including animal holding buildings for rhinos and elephants, among other animals, as well as the roundhouse where the trains are stored. It takes about twelve minutes for each train to complete a round trip on the line: seven minutes from Harambe Station to Conservation Station, and five minutes from Conservation Station to Harambe Station. The railway is built to a  narrow gauge, which is smaller than the  currently used on East African railways. The full journey is a  round trip.

The railway is part of the fictitious Eastern Star Railway, running from Lusaka to Nairobi and Kisangani. Despite the dated and weathered appearance of the trains, they are actually brand-new models built by Severn Lamb in Alcester, England.

History
Early plans for Disney's Animal Kingdom called for a railway that would have taken guests through the Savannah plains. This idea was modified, however, when concerns about the safety of the animals was raised. Instead, Disney decided to create a railway that would take guests from the Village of Harambe in the Africa section of the park to Conservation Station in the Rafiki's Planet Watch section of the park. Imagineer George McGinnis came out of retirement to design the locomotives for the attraction. They were designed to give guests the impression that the trains had been traveling through Africa for a hundred years, collecting grime and rust along the way. According to imagineer Joe Rohde, the idea was to create a look for vehicles "that would be seen today in Africa and Asia, long after their original use in Europe in the late 1800s."

The locomotives and rail cars themselves were built in 1997 by Severn Lamb, Ltd. in Alcester, England. Production of the locomotives was overseen by Imagineers Bob Harpur and Joel Fritsche. On April 22, 1998, the Wildlife Express Train opened with the rest of Disney's Animal Kingdom. The Wildlife Express Train and Rafiki's Planet Watch were both temporarily closed on October 21, 2018, and reopened on July 11, 2019.

Rolling stock

The Wildlife Express Train operates three  steam-outline locomotives built by Severn Lamb of Stratford-upon-Avon, United Kingdom, in 1997 before the park's opening the following year. The locomotives are all a different color: one red, one black, and one green. These locomotives are based on the L&YR Class 5 and Class 6 locomotives, designed by John Aspinall, and built in 1898 at Horwich Works for the Lancashire & Yorkshire Railway in England, which share the same  wheel arrangement and body design. The builder's plates of the locomotives, however, state that they were built in 1926 by Beyer, Peacock & Company at Gorton Foundry. Their numbers are 02594 (red), 04982 (black), and 00174 (green), with the former carrying the name R. Baba Harpoor, in honor of Imagineer Bob Harpur.

The rail line also uses two sets of train cars, each consisting of five coaches with a total seating capacity of 250 people on contoured benches facing sideways per train. The two trains are colored red and green. Both sets contain various bins and items on the roof, representing the luggage that passengers have brought aboard the train.

See also

Serengeti Express
Rail transport in Walt Disney Parks and Resorts

References

External links

Official website
Severn Lamb – Jungle Express train model

Amusement rides introduced in 1998
Amusement rides introduced in 2019
Amusement rides that closed in 2018
1998 establishments in Florida
3 ft gauge railways in the United States
Disney's Animal Kingdom 
Africa (Disney's Animal Kingdom)
Heritage railroads in Florida
Rail transport in Walt Disney Parks and Resorts
Railroads of amusement parks in the United States
Walt Disney World transit